The Filmfare Best Female Debut is presented by the Filmfare magazine as part of its annual Filmfare Awards South for South Indian films.

Recipients

References

Filmfare Awards South
Film awards for debut actress